Roots and Wings, released on 26 November 2003, is a studio album from Swedish pop and country singer Jill Johnson. It peaked at number five on the Swedish Albums Chart.

Track listing
Can't Get Enough of You - 3:16
God's Gift - 3:13
Breakfast in New York - 4:05
Natalie - 3:35
A Woman Knows - 3:44
You Can't Love Me Too Much - 3:24
Good for You - 2:54
You're Still Here - 3:15
Hopelessly Devoted - 4:05
Roots and Wings - 3:27
It Ain't the End of the World - 2:43
When I Found You - 4:17
Time Will Fly - 3:49
Desperado - 3:37

Charts

Weekly charts

Year-end charts

References

2003 albums
Jill Johnson albums